Special Forces: Ultimate Hell Week is a British reality television series where physically fit civilian contestants are put through special forces style selection exercises. Each episode features an instructor and exercises from a different force, and contestants either withdraw voluntarily, are medically withdrawn, or are dismissed for poor performance.

The first series was presented by former cricket player Andrew Flintoff and the second by media personality Reggie Yates.

Instructors

Series 1

Series 2

Contestants

Series 1 
Seven (7) women and twenty-two (22) men entered base-camp on day 1.

Series 2

Locations

Series 1 
Wales, United Kingdom

Series 2 
Wemmershoek, Western Cape, South Africa

See also
SAS: Are You Tough Enough? (2002-2004)
SAS: Who Dares Wins (2015-)

References

External links
 
 

2015 British television series debuts
2017 British television series endings
2010s British reality television series
BBC high definition shows
BBC reality television shows
British military television series
English-language television shows
Television shows set in Wales
Television shows set in South Africa